Andrea Šušnjara (born 26 February 1987) is a Croatian singer who was the Croatian entrant for the Eurovision Song Contest 2009. She, alongside Igor Cukrov, were the winners of Dora 2009, performing the song "Lijepa Tena" (Beautiful Tena). At Eurovision they performed in the second semi-final as the opening act and qualified for the final as the jury's selected qualifier. In the final they finished in 18th place with 45 points.

She also competed to represent Croatia at the Eurovision Song Contest 2004, performing the song "Noah" at Dora 2004. She won the semi-final and qualified to the final, where she finished second, losing out to Ivan Mikulić.
In May 2010, she joined Magazin, a Croatian pop band from Split.

References

External links 

1987 births
21st-century Croatian women singers
Croatian pop singers
Musicians from Split, Croatia
Croatian sopranos
Living people
Eurovision Song Contest entrants of 2009